Asghar Ali may refer to:

 Asghar Ali (cricketer, born 1971), United Arab Emirates cricketer
 Asghar Ali (cricketer, born 1924) (1924–1979), cricketer in India from 1943 to 1949, and in Pakistan from 1949 to 1957